Sil Nakya is a populated place situated in Pima County, Arizona, United States. Historically, it has also been known as Beebhak, San Lorenzo, San Lorenzo Well, Saranake, Seranake, Silinakik, and Silynarki. Sil Nakya became its official name as a result of a decision by the Board on Geographic Names in 1941. Sil nakya is O'odham for "saddle hangs".

References

Populated places in Pima County, Arizona